Development Business, also known as United Nations Development Business, UN Development Business, UNDB or DB is an online and print publication issued by the United Nations Department of Public Information. It is the official source of international procurement information and contains current tender announcements, contract awards and operational summaries from all major international development banks, national governments and the United Nations System.

Origins and development

The United Nations Department of Public Information launched Development Business in 1978 with the support of the World Bank, African Development Bank, Asian Development Bank, Caribbean Development Bank and Inter-American Development Bank.

Based on an agreement between the United Nations and the World Bank in 1981, Development Business became the official source for World Bank Procurement Notices, Contract Awards, and Project Approvals. In 1998, the agreement was re-negotiated. Included in this agreement was a joint venture to create an electronic version of the publication on the World Wide Web. Today, Development Business is the primary publication for all major multilateral development banks, United Nations agencies, and several national governments, many of whom have made the publication of their tenders and contracts in Development Business mandatory.

Partners

Development Business receives its procurement information for publishing from governments, the UN system and development banks. Among its long-standing partners are:

 The World Bank
 United Nations Procurement Division
 United Nations Development Programme
 AusAID
 Asian Development Bank
 Caribbean Development Bank
 European Bank for Reconstruction and Development
 Inter-American Development Bank
 International Finance Corporation
 International Fund for Agricultural Development
 Islamic Development Bank
 Millennium Challenge Corporation
 North American Development Bank
 West African Development Bank

Services

Development Business follows a subscription-based model. Subscription options are made up of combinations of services including unlimited online access to projects and tender information, a print version, and monthly operational summaries issued by development banks. Online access includes a fully searchable database of:

 Tender notices
 Contract awards
 Development bank operational summaries

Outreach

Development Business actively distributes its print publication to the UN Member States, especially to its partners in developing countries and least developed countries, where most projects are being implemented. To make its information on tenders and business opportunities available to a large pool of qualified suppliers, it has partnered with the United Nations Development Programme, UN Information Centers, UN Member States and their respective missions and several Chambers of Commerce.

References

External links
 Official Directory of the UN System
 World Bank Procurement

United Nations documents